Joe Rando (born April 10, 1955) is a former American ice hockey player from Dedham, Massachusetts.

Rando was born on April 10, 1955, to Frank Rando. He was drafted in the sixth round (87th overall) by the New England Whalers in the 1974 World Hockey Association draft and then in the ninth round (156th overall) by the Boston Bruins in the 1975 National Hockey League draft. He played defense and received three stitches over his right eye after getting into a fight in his first ever game in the NHL. He also played for the University of New Hampshire and Dedham High School.

He later coached hockey. His siblings include Diana, Joanne, Lois, and Linda.

References

Sportspeople from Dedham, Massachusetts
Boston Bruins draft picks
Dedham High School alumni
University of New Hampshire alumni
Boston Bruins players
New England Whalers draft picks
1955 births
Living people